Charles Robert "Splinter" Johnson (June 16, 1920 – August 6, 2002) was an American professional basketball player. He played in the National Basketball League for the Hammond Ciesar All-Americans during the 1940–41 season and averaged 4.0 points per game.

References 

1920 births
2002 deaths
American men's basketball players
Basketball players from Indiana
Centers (basketball)
Forwards (basketball)
Hammond Ciesar All-Americans players
People from Frankfort, Indiana
United States Army personnel of World War II